Hex signs are a form of Pennsylvania Dutch folk art, related to fraktur, found in the Fancy Dutch tradition in Pennsylvania Dutch Country. Barn paintings, usually in the form of "stars in circles", began to appear on the landscape in the early 19th century and became widespread decades later when commercial ready-mixed paint became readily available. By the 1950s commercialized hex signs, aimed at the tourist market, became popular and these often include stars, compass roses, stylized birds known as distelfinks, hearts, tulips, or a tree of life. Two schools of thought exist on the meaning of hex signs. One school ascribes a talismanic nature to the signs; the other sees them as purely decorative. Both schools recognize that there are sometimes superstitions associated with certain hex sign themes and neither ascribes strong magical power to them. The Amish do not use hex signs.

Form and use
Painted barn stars in circular borders are a common sight on Pennsylvania Dutch barns in central and southeastern Pennsylvania, especially in Berks County, Lancaster County and Lehigh County. However, the modern decoration of barns is a late development in Pennsylvania Dutch folk art. Prior to the 1830s, the cost of paint meant that most barns were unpainted. As paint became affordable, the Pennsylvania Dutch began to decorate their barns much like they decorated items in their homes. Barn decorating reached its peak in the early 20th century, at which time there were many artists who specialized in barn decorating. Drawing from a large repertoire of designs, barn painters combined many elements in their decorations. The geometric patterns of quilts can be seen in the patterns of many hex signs. Hearts and tulips seen on barns are commonly found on elaborately lettered and decorated birth, baptism and marriage certificates known as fraktur.

Throughout the 20th century, hex signs were often produced as commodities for the tourist industry in Pennsylvania. These signs could be bought and then mounted onto barns and used as household decorations. Jacob Zook of Paradise, Pennsylvania, claimed to have originated the modern mountable sign in 1942, based on traditional designs, to be sold in souvenir gift shops to tourists along the Lincoln Highway. Edward Buchak of Gilbertsville, Pennsylvania designed and produced many Jacob Zook signs via screen printing. William Schuster, Milton Hill, Johnny Ott, and Johnny and Eric Claypoole also contributed to this hex sign revival or adaptation. Modern artists may stress the symbolic meanings, for example, a horse head is used to protect animals from disease and the building from lightning and a dove represents peace and contentment. An unusual use is the official logo of the Pennsylvania Bureau of Radiation Protection, which incorporates the international symbol for radiation into its yellow-and-red adaptation of a traditional hex sign design.

Controversy over origins
There are two opposing schools of belief regarding the derivation of the name. The term hex with occult connotations may derive from the Pennsylvania German word "hex" (German "Hexe", Dutch "Heks"), meaning "witch". However, the term "hex sign" was not used until the 20th century, after 1924 when Wallace Nutting's book Pennsylvania Beautiful was published. Nutting, who was not a Pennsylvania native, interviewed farmers about their distinctive barn decoration. Before this time there was no standardized term and many Pennsylvania German farmers simply called the signs "blume" or "sterne" (meaning flowers or stars). However one farmer used the term "Hexefoos" in his description. The term became popular with Pennsylvania Germans themselves during the blossoming tourist trade of southeastern Pennsylvania. 

These signs were traditionally adorned with six-pointed stars. There is also the belief that the origin leading to the word "hex sign" is that English settlers mispronounced the German word for six, "sechs", as "hex". 

In recent years, hex signs have come to be used by non–Pennsylvania Dutch persons as talismans for folk magic rather than as items of decoration. Some believe that both the Pennsylvania German barn design and hex designs originate with the Alpine Germans. They note that hexes are of pre-Christian Germanic origin; for instance, a circled rosette is called the Sun of the Alps in Padania (the Po Valley). Based on this history, neopagans or Germanic heathens have taken up the practice of creating hex signs, incorporating other pre-Christian signs and symbols into the hex work. Gandee, in his book Strange Experience, Autobiography of a Hexenmeister, described hex signs as "painted prayers".

Some view the designs as decorative symbols of ethnic identification, possibly originating in reaction to 19th century attempts made by the government to suppress the Pennsylvania German language. Anabaptist sects, such as the Amish and Mennonites, in the region have a negative view of hex signs, and they are rarely, if ever, seen on an Amish or Mennonite household or farm.

See also
 Pentagram
 Pow-wow (folk magic)

References

Sources

External links
 Care And Use of Pennsylvania Dutch Hex Signs; Their Symbolism and Meanings
 Pictures of hand painted Hex Signs
 Hex Sign Themes
 Hex Signs at Pennsylvania Dutch.com
 Hex Signs History
 Hex Signs in PA Dutch Country
 Several digitized books on Pennsylvania Dutch arts and crafts, design, and prints from The Metropolitan Museum of Art Libraries

19th-century introductions
American folk art
Magic symbols
Ornaments (architecture)
Pennsylvania folklore
Pennsylvania Dutch culture